The 1907 Ohio State Buckeyes football team was an American football team that represented Ohio State University during the 1907 college football season. The Buckeyes compiled a 7–2–1 record and outscored their opponents by a combined total of 160 to 49 in their second season under head coach Albert E. Herrnstein.

Schedule

References

Ohio State
Ohio State Buckeyes football seasons
Ohio State Buckeyes football